Paunküla Reservoir is located in Kiruvere Village, Kose Parish, Harju County, Estonia near Ardu.

The reservoir is part of the Tallinn water supply system and is connected to upstream Jägala river via Sae-Paunküla Canal.

Pirita river runs isolated along the southern shore of the reservoir in a ditch and is only connected to the reservoir at the north-eastern end of the reservoir.

History 
The reservoir was first flooded in 1960. The reservoir reached its current size in 1979.

Gallery

See also 
Soodla Reservoir
Raudoja Reservoir
Aavoja Reservoir
Kaunissaare Reservoir
Vaskjala Reservoir
Lake Ülemiste
List of lakes of Estonia

References

Kose Parish
Reservoirs in Estonia
Lakes of Harju County